or  is a lake in the municipality of Lierne in Trøndelag county, Norway.  The  lake flows out into the river Guselva which flows a short distance into the larger lake Lenglingen.

See also
List of lakes in Norway

References

Lierne
Lakes of Trøndelag